Stringtown is an unincorporated community in Greene County, in the U.S. state of Pennsylvania.

History
In 1999, two residents hypothesized that the community may have been derived from the way the houses are "all strung out" or because the road "runs like a string".

References

Unincorporated communities in Greene County, Pennsylvania
Unincorporated communities in Pennsylvania